The Great American Snuff Film is a 2003 American horror film directed by Sean Tretta. Purporting to be real footage taken by a pair of serial killers, the film follows two young women who have been kidnapped and are being forced to star in a snuff film.  The film is shown in a mix of third-person view and found footage-style. In 2010, the film was followed by a sequel titled The Greatest American Snuff Film.

Cast
 Mike Marsh as William Allen Grone
 Ryan Hutman as Roy
 Melinda Lorenz as Patti
 Holi Tavernier as Sarah
 Jason Dinger as Chuck
 Melanie Trimble
 April Hinojosa
 Jeff Tretta as David
 Kierra Bowden
 Andrea Villa

References

External links
 
 

American horror films
2003 films
American mockumentary films
Camcorder films
Films about snuff films
American serial killer films
2000s exploitation films
Films about rape
Films about kidnapping
Necrophilia in film
Found footage films
2003 horror films
2000s serial killer films
2000s English-language films
2000s American films